Charlie Raposo (born 15 January 1996) is a British alpine ski racer.

He has been competing on the World Cup tour for three seasons, as well as the European Cup tour where he frequently competes for podium positions. He has competed at three World Ski Championships, his first being at the 2015 World Championships in Beaver Creek, USA, in the giant slalom.

In April 2022, it was announced that Charlie would be the first official signed skier for Marcel Hirscher's ski brand, Van Deer despite intense speculation regarding who the first signee would be in the build up to the announcement suggesting many other top names.

References

External links
 

1996 births
British male alpine skiers
Living people
Place of birth missing (living people)